Alexandra Suda (born 1981) is a Canadian art historian who was formerly the director of the National Gallery of Canada. In 2022, she was appointed the director of the Philadelphia Museum of Art.

Early life and education
Suda was born in Orillia, Ontario and raised in Toronto, Ontario. She completed a BA at Princeton University, an MA at Williams College, before earning her PhD at The Institute of Fine Arts at New York University.

Career 
She served as Curator of European Art at the Art Gallery of Ontario. According to the Governor General's Canadian Leadership Conference, her Small Wonders: Gothic Boxwood Miniatures exhibition, held in Ontario, New York and Amsterdam, "received extensive positive press for its high level of scholarship which is driven by the public's curiosity about these wondrous works of art." In 2020, Suda was part of a jury that chose Stan Douglas to represent Canada at the Venice Biennale. In April 2019, Suda was named director of the National Gallery of Canada. Her tenure was criticized for lacking serious leadership and planning, being feckless and directed by dogma and mantra.

In June 2022, the Philadelphia Museum of Art announced that Suda would assume the role of director at the Museum in September of that year. In September 2022, workers at that museum held a strike over wages and working conditions which lasted 19 days. She stayed silent on the matter with a museum spokesperson saying she would not be part of the negotiations.

Selected publications

Suda, Alexandra;  Ellis, Lisa. "Small Wonders: Gothic Boxwood Miniatures". Art Gallery of Ontario, 2016. 
 Suda, Alexandra, Boehm, Barbara Drake. "Handpicked: Collecting Boxwood Carvings from the Sixteenth to the Twenty-First Centuries." In: Scholten, Frits (ed), "Small Wonders: Late-Gothic Boxwood Micro-Carvings from the Low Countries". Amsterdam: Rijksmuseum, 2016. 
 "The Girona Martyrology: Belief in the guise of Violence and Beauty". Autopsia: Blut- und Augenzeugen, 2014

References

Canadian art historians
Williams College alumni
Living people
People from Orillia
1981 births
New York University Institute of Fine Arts alumni
Princeton University alumni